Kazuo Araya (born 2 January 1949) is a Japanese skier. He competed in the Nordic combined event at the 1972 Winter Olympics.

References

External links
 

1949 births
Living people
Japanese male Nordic combined skiers
Olympic Nordic combined skiers of Japan
Nordic combined skiers at the 1972 Winter Olympics
Sportspeople from Hokkaido
Competitors at the 1972 Winter Universiade